La Chevrolière is a commune in the Loire-Atlantique department in western France.

Population

International relations

La Chevrolière is twinned with Lyndhurst, United Kingdom.

See also

Communes of the Loire-Atlantique department

References

External links

 La Chevrolière 

Communes of Loire-Atlantique